Toshiko Sade (born 8 March 1947) is a Japanese former professional tennis player.

Active in the 1970s, Sade appeared at Wimbledon as a doubles player and made the singles main draw of the 1974 Australian Open, where she lost in the second round to Janet Fallis. She was the All Japan singles champion in 1974 and represented Japan at the Asian Games in Tehran that year, winning a gold medal in the women's doubles with Kayoko Fukuoka. In 1975 she featured in six Federation Cup rubbers for Japan and registered two wins.

See also
List of Japan Fed Cup team representatives

References

External links
 
 
 

1947 births
Living people
Japanese female tennis players
Medalists at the 1974 Asian Games
Tennis players at the 1974 Asian Games
Asian Games gold medalists for Japan
Asian Games bronze medalists for Japan
Asian Games medalists in tennis
20th-century Japanese women
21st-century Japanese women